William Hugh Joseph Clifford (24 December 1823 – 14 August 1893) was an English prelate of the Roman Catholic Church. He served as Bishop of Clifton from 1857 to 1893.

Born in Irnham, Lincolnshire on 24 December 1823, the son of Hugh Clifford, 7th Baron Clifford of Chudleigh and Mary Lucy Weld, daughter of Cardinal Thomas Weld. He was ordained to the priesthood on 25 August 1850. Six and a half years later, he was appointed the Bishop of the Diocese of Clifton on 29 January 1857. His consecration to the Episcopate took place at the Sistine Chapel on 15 February 1857, the principal consecrator was Pope Pius IX, with Archbishop George Errington as co-consecrator. Bishop Clifford attended the First Vatican Council as one of the 693 council fathers, held between 8 December 1869 to 20 October 1870.

He died in office on 14 August 1893, aged 69.

References

Bibliography

 

1823 births
1893 deaths
19th-century Roman Catholic bishops in England
People from South Kesteven District
Roman Catholic bishops of Clifton
Younger sons of barons